"Painless" is a song by Australian rock band Baby Animals. It was released in November 1991 as their third single from their debut studio album Baby Animals (1991). The song peaked at number 49 on the ARIA Singles Chart. It became the band's first charting single in New Zealand and on the US Hot Mainstream Rock Tracks in 1992 after performing the track on Late Night with David Letterman.

Track listings
Vinyl/CD single (CCD 053)
 "Painless" – 3:41
 "Dedicate" – 4:53

US CD single (72787-25006-4)
 "Painless" – 3:41
 "Album Preview" (mix of "Rush You", "One Word", "Break My Heart") – 5:59

Charts

External links

Lyrics of this song - Painless

References

1991 songs
1991 singles
Baby Animals songs
Songs written by Suze DeMarchi
Song recordings produced by Mike Chapman